Alyn and Deeside is a parliamentary constituency represented in the House of Commons of the Parliament of the United Kingdom (at Westminster). The constituency was created in 1983, and it elects one Member of Parliament (MP) by the first-past-the-post method of election.

The Alyn and Deeside Senedd constituency was created with the same boundaries in 1999.

Constituency profile
This Welsh seat on the English border is part of the industrial hinterland north of Wrexham and west of Chester, with large employers including Toyota, BAE and Airbus. The main population areas in the current seat include Shotton, Connah's Quay, Buckley, Hawarden and Caergwrle.
It was formerly known as East Flintshire until the 1983 boundary review, in which it was renamed after the Alyn and Deeside district created in 1974.

Boundaries

1983–1997: The District of Alyn and Deeside, and the Borough of Wrexham Maelor wards 13 and 14.

1997–2010: The District of Alyn and Deeside.

2010–present: The Flintshire County electoral divisions of Aston, Broughton North East, Broughton South, Buckley Bistre East, Buckley Bistre West, Buckley Mountain, Buckley Pentrobin, Caergwrle, Connah's Quay Central, Connah's Quay Golftyn, Connah's Quay South, Connah's Quay Wepre, Ewloe, Hawarden, Higher Kinnerton, Hope, Llanfynydd, Mancot, Penyffordd, Queensferry, Saltney Mold Junction, Saltney Stonebridge, Sealand, Shotton East, Shotton Higher, Shotton West, and Treuddyn.

Members of Parliament

Elections

Elections in the 1980s

Elections in the 1990s

Elections in the 2000s

Elections in the 2010s

Of the 50 rejected ballots:
41 were either unmarked or it was uncertain who the vote was for.
9 voted for more than one candidate.

In February 2015, the Conservative Party inadvertently leaked a list of non-target seats considered safe Labour, or where winning was considered highly unlikely, which included Alyn and Deeside.
Independent Phil Woods announced he would stand, but did not do so.

Of the 84 rejected ballots:
63 were either unmarked or it was uncertain who the vote was for.
17 voted for more than one candidate.
4 had writing or mark by which the voter could be identified.

Of the 121 rejected ballots:
103 were either unmarked or it was uncertain who the vote was for.
17 voted for more than one candidate.
1 had want of official mark.

See also
 Alyn and Deeside (Senedd constituency)
 List of parliamentary constituencies in Clwyd
 List of parliamentary constituencies in Wales

Notes

References

External links
Politics Resources (Election results from 1922 onwards)
Electoral Calculus (Election results from 1955 onwards)
2017 Election House Of Commons Library 2017 Election report
A Vision Of Britain Through Time (Constituency elector numbers)

Parliamentary constituencies in North Wales
Constituencies of the Parliament of the United Kingdom established in 1983